The Emirate of Dubai (pr. ) is one of the seven emirates of the United Arab Emirates. It is the most populous emirate of the UAE. The capital of the emirate is the eponymous city, Dubai.

Geography
The city of Dubai is located on the coast of the Persian Gulf, while the Emirate stretches inland and is bordered to the south by the emirate of Abu Dhabi, to the northeast by the emirate of Sharjah, to the southeast by the country of Oman, to the east by the emirate of Ajman, and to the north by the emirate of Ras Al Khaimah.

Municipalities
The 4 municipalities of Dubai are:
 Dubai 
 Jebel Ali
 Jumeirah
 Hatta

History
In the early 19th century, the coastal township of Dubai was located within the territorial lands of the Bani Yas tribe, however Dubai was also on the borderlands near the control of the powerful Al Qasimi clan. This caused both groups to assert authority over the town.

In the 19th century, pearls were the main commodity of the region, with buyers from Mumbai, commerce peaked in 1897.

In 1901, Maktoum bin Hasher Al Maktoum established Dubai as a free port with no taxation on imports or exports and also gave merchants parcels of land and guarantees of protection and tolerance. These policies saw a movement of merchants not only directly from Lingeh, but also those who had settled in Ras Al Khaimah and Sharjah (which had historical links with Lingeh through the Al Qawasim tribe) to Dubai. An indicator of the growing importance of Dubai can be gained from the movements of the steamer of the Bombay and Persia Steam Navigation Company, which from 1899 to 1901 paid five visits annually to Dubai. In 1902 the company's vessels made 21 visits to Dubai and from 1904 on, the steamers called fortnightly – in 1906, trading 70,000 tonnes of cargo. The frequency of these vessels helped to accelerate Dubai's role as an emerging port and trading hub of preference. British historian John Lorimer noted the transfer of merchants from Lingeh "bids fair to become complete and permanent", and also that the town had by 1906 supplanted Lingeh as the chief entrepôt of the Trucial States. By 1908, Dubai was home to a population of some 10,000 people.

By the 1930s and 1940s, the pearl business crashed due to cultured pearls from Japan. The economy crashed which triggered a famine. Hopes were reignited when in 1937 an oil exploration contract was signed which guaranteed royalty rights for Dubai and concessionary payments to Sheikh Saeed bin Maktoum. However, due to World War II, oil would not be struck until 1966 at the Fateh oil field.

In December 1971, the emirates united to form the United Arab Emirates, thus ending their status as British Protectorates.

The ruler of the emirate is Sheikh Mohammed bin Rashid Al Maktoum. The emirate is made up of various other municipalities and villages. The inland exclave of Hatta is located about 134 km east of the city of Dubai. The exclave is bordered by Oman to the east and south, the villages of Sayh Mudayrah and Masfout in Ajman to the west, and Ras Al Khaimah to the north.

Rulers

 July 9, 1833 – 1836: Sheikh Obeid bin Said bin Rashid (d. 1836)
 July 9, 1833 – 1852: Sheikh Maktoum bin Butti bin Suhail (d. 1852)
 1852 – 1859: Sheikh Saeed bin Butti (d. 1859)
 1859 – November 22, 1886: Sheikh Hasher bin Maktoum (d. 1886)
 November 22, 1886 – April 7, 1894: Sheikh Rashid bin Maktoum (d. 1894)
 April 7, 1894 – February 16, 1906: Sheikh Maktoum bin Hasher Al Maktoum (d. 1906)
 February 16, 1906 – November 1912: Sheikh Butti bin Suhail Al Maktoum (d. 1912)
 November 1912 – September 1958: Sheikh Saeed bin Maktoum bin Hasher Al Maktoum (d. 1958)
 September 1958 – October 7, 1990: Sheikh Rashid bin Saeed Al Maktoum (d. 1990)
 October 7, 1990 – January 4, 2006: Sheikh Maktoum bin Rashid Al Maktoum (d. 2006)
 January 4, 2006: Sheikh Mohammed bin Rashid Al Maktoum (b. 1949)

Demographics

See also
 Outline of Dubai
 Emirates of the United Arab Emirates

References

External links

Dubai.ae – Dubai Government official website

 
Persian Gulf
Populated coastal places in the United Arab Emirates
Islamic monarchies